William Edward Goffigan (March 10, 1841 – August 9, 1909) was an American politician who served in the Virginia House of Delegates. First elected in 1907, he died shortly after winning renomination to his seat.

References

External links 

1841 births
1909 deaths
Members of the Virginia House of Delegates
20th-century American politicians
People of Virginia in the American Civil War